White Hall Township is one of thirteen townships in Greene County, Illinois, USA.  As of the 2010 census, its population was 3,040 and it contained 1,308 housing units.

Geography

Cities, towns, villages
 White Hall

Unincorporated towns
 Belltown at 
(This list is based on USGS data and may include former settlements.)

Cemeteries
The township contains these nine cemeteries: Belltown, Henderson, Hicks, Highstreet, Jones, North, Sanders, Veterans of Foreign Wars Memorial and White Hall.

Major highways
  Illinois Route 106
  Illinois Route 267

Landmarks
 Conrad Park Street
 Lions Park

Demographics

School districts
 Greenfield Community Unit School District 10
 North Greene Unit School District 3

Political districts
 Illinois' 17th congressional district
 State House District 97
 State Senate District 49

Notes

References
 
 United States Census Bureau 2007 TIGER/Line Shapefiles
 United States National Atlas

External links
 City-Data.com
 Illinois State Archives

Townships in Greene County, Illinois
Townships in Illinois